Nikita Vitalyevich Makarov (born 2 January 2001) is a Russian football player.

Club career
He first was registered as a player of the senior squad of FC Rubin Kazan in February 2018. He made his debut in the Russian Premier League for Rubin on 10 August 2019 in a game against FC Krasnodar.

On 15 July 2020, he joined FC Veles Moscow on loan.

References

External links
 
 
 

2001 births
Sportspeople from Ulyanovsk
Living people
Russian footballers
Russia youth international footballers
Association football midfielders
Russian Premier League players
FC Rubin Kazan players
FC Veles Moscow players